Salvatory Naluyaga Machemli (born 14 January 1971) is a Tanzanian CHADEMA politician and Member of Parliament for Ukerewe constituency since 2010.

References

1971 births
Living people
Chadema MPs
Tanzanian MPs 2010–2015